Pheia discophora is a moth in the subfamily Arctiinae. It was described by Paul Dognin in 1909. It is found in Colombia.

References

Natural History Museum Lepidoptera generic names catalog

Further reading
 [Plate VI, fig 16].

Moths described in 1909
discophora